Simon Breitfuss Kammerlander (born 29 November 1992) is a Bolivian-Austrian alpine ski racer. Breitfuss Kammerlander specializes in the technical events of slalom and giant slalom. Breitfuss Kammerlander made his World Cup debut on 23 October 2016.

Career
Breitfuss Kammerlander made his World Cup debut at the Sölden Giant slalom on 23 October 2016; he failed to qualify for the second run, finishing in 78th place. He competed for Bolivia at the 2017 Alpine World Ski Championships. He finished 46th in the Super-G and failed to finish the first run of the Giant slalom and Slalom. He competed for Bolivia at the 2018 Winter Olympics. Kammerlander was the country's flag bearer during the opening ceremony.

He represented Bolivia at the 2022 Winter Olympics.

World Championship results

References

External links
 
 
 

Breitfuss Kammerlander
Breitfuss Kammerlander
Breitfuss Kammerlander
Breitfuss Kammerlander
Austrian emigrants to Bolivia
Alpine skiers at the 2018 Winter Olympics
Alpine skiers at the 2022 Winter Olympics
Olympic alpine skiers of Bolivia
People from Zams
Sportspeople from Tyrol (state)